Merya or Meryanic is an extinct Finno-Ugric language, which was spoken by the Meryans. Merya began to be assimilated by East Slavs when their territory became incorporated into Kievan Rus' in the 10th century. However some Merya speakers might have even lived in the 18th century. There is also a theory that the word for "Moscow" originates from the Merya language. The Meryan language stretched to the western parts of Vologda Oblast and Moscow.

Classification 
There is no general agreement on the relationship of Merya with its neighboring Uralic languages. It is sometimes left as unclassified within the western end of the family.

 A traditional account places Merya as a member of the Volga-Finnic group, comprising also the Mordvinic and Mari languages. However, Volga Finnic is today considered obsolete.
 Eugene Helimski supposed that the Merya language was part of a "northwest" group of Finno-Ugric, including also Balto-Finnic and Sami. Helimski argued that even though there are Mari parallels, they do not justify a close relationship with Mari and could be due to adjacency of the language areas.
 Gábor Bereczki supposed that the Merya language was a part of the Balto-Finnic group.
One hypothesis classifies the Merya as a western branch of the Mari people rather than as a separate tribe. Their ethnonyms are basically identical, Merya being a Russian transcription of the Mari self-designation, Мäрӹ (Märӛ).
T. Semenov and M. Fasmer believed Merya to be a close relative of Mari. Max Vasmer saw that many Merya toponyms have Mari parallels.
Mordvinian author Aleksandr Sharonov claimed that Merya is an Erzyan dialect, however this doesn't have much support.

Rahkonen (2013) argues that the likewise unattested and unclassified-within-Uralic Muromian language was a close relative of Merya, perhaps even a dialect of Meryan.

A probable characteristic of the Merya language, which some researchers have noted, is the plural -k, while most Uralic languages use -t for the plural.

Reconstruction 
There have been attempts to re-construct Merya based on toponyms, onomastics and words in Russian dialects by O. B. Tkachenko, Arja Ahlqvist and A. K. Matveev among others. The first reconstructions were done in 1985 by O. B. Tkachenko. The latest book about Merya reconstructions was published in 2019. As an example: in Russian toponyms around where Merya was spoken, an ending -яхр (-jaxr) is regularly seen in names relating to lakes. This also resembles, but does not exactly match, the words for 'lake' in western Uralic languages, such as Finnish järvi, Northern Sami jávri, Erzya ерьке (jerʹke), Meadow Mari ер (jer) (from a common proto-form *jäwrä). From these it can be inferred that -яхр likely continues the Meryan word for 'lake', which may have had a shape such as  

According to Rahkonen, in Merya areas there is a word veks, which is probably cognate with the Komi word вис (vis) 'middle river', and similar also to an element vieksi which appears in Finnish toponyms. From Merya toponyms it can also be seen that words such as volo 'down' (Finnish: ala), vondo 'give' (Finnish: antaa) existed in the Merya language. From this it can be concluded that Finnish a- corresponds to vo- or o- in the Merya language. Another thing that can be observed is the Finnish sound "a" corresponding to a Merya "o", for example a hydronym  can be seen, which can be compared to Finnish kala 'fish'. In the Muroma-Merya territory a word  can be observed, which can be compared to Finnic *ülä ‘upper’.

Phonology 
Meryan phonology has been studied only in general terms, relying on Russian dialects in the Kostroma and Yaroslavl regions. Helimski suggests that Merya likely developed massive reduction of word-final syllables. The Merya language only allowed one consonant at the beginning of words, and likely placed stress on the first syllable of the word. It likely did not feature vowel harmony. The vowels /ö/, /ä/ and /y/ likely existed in the Merya language.

See also 
Volga Finns
Mari language

References

External links 
 Grammar of Merya
 Merjamaa

Extinct languages of Europe
Uralic languages
Medieval languages